The Anales de Química was a peer-review scientific journal in the field of chemistry. The first issue was published in 1903 by the Real Sociedad Española de Física y Química (later the Real Sociedad Española de Química, the Spanish Royal Society of Chemistry). Its publication ended in 1998.

History
The Anales des Quimica were published in the following order:

In 1948 (vol. 44), the journal was split into two sections:
Anales de la Real Sociedad Española de Física y Química/Ser.
 Anales de la Real Sociedad Española de Física y Química/Ser.

Section A subsequently became the Anales de Física.

From 1980 (vol. 76) to 1989 (vol. 85) this title was again split in three sections:

 Anales de Química/Serie A, Química Física y Ingenieria Química (CODEN: AQSTDQ)
 Anales de Química/Serie B, Química Inorgánica y Química Analítica (CODEN: AQSAD3)
 Anales de Química/Serie C, Química Orgánica y Bioquímica (CODEN: AQSBD6)

Finally, the journal was renamed to Anales de Química, International Edition (1996, vol. 92, to 1998, vol. 94; (CODEN: AQIEFZ) until it was merged in 1998 to form the European Journal of Organic Chemistry and the European Journal of Inorganic Chemistry.

Legacy 
To continue the tradition of Anales de Química, the Spanish Royal Society of Chemistry established a new journal in 1999, the Anales de la Real Sociedad Española de Química.

See also 

 Chemische Berichte
 Bulletin des Sociétés Chimiques Belges
 Bulletin de la Société Chimique de France
 European Journal of Inorganic Chemistry
 European Journal of Organic Chemistry
 Gazzetta Chimica Italiana
 Liebigs Annalen
 Recueil des Travaux Chimiques des Pays-Bas
 Chimika Chronika
 Revista Portuguesa de Química
 ACH—Models in Chemistry

References

External links 
 Spanish Royal Society of Chemistry

1903 establishments in Spain
1998 disestablishments in Spain
Chemistry journals
Publications established in 1903
Spanish-language journals
Publications disestablished in 1998
Defunct journals
Academic journals published by learned and professional societies